Try a Little Kindness is  the thirteenth album by American singer/guitarist Glen Campbell, released in 1970. The title track was one of Campbell's favorite songs.

The album peaked at No. 28 on the UK Albums Chart.

Track listing

Side one
"Try a Little Kindness" (Curt Sapaugh, Bobby Austin) – 2:23
"Both Sides Now" (Joni Mitchell) – 3:44
"For My Woman's Love" (Ben Peters) – 3:07
"Country Girl" (Craig Smith) – 2:51
"All the Way" (Jimmy Van Heusen, Sammy Cahn) – 3:10
"Where Do You Go" (Ed Penney, John Domurad) – 2:45

Side two
"Honey Come Back" (Jimmy Webb) – 3:00
"Folk Singer" (C. E. Daniels) – 2:45
"Love Is Not a Game" (Jerry Goldstein) – 2:10
"Once More with Feeling" (Shirley Nelson) – 3:16
"And the World Keeps Spinning" (Ron Green, Ron Price) – 2:37
"Home Again" (Larry Rintye, Jesse Hodges) – 2:48

Personnel
Glen Campbell – vocals, acoustic guitar
Al Casey – acoustic guitar
Joe Osborn – bass
Carol Kaye – bass
Hal Blaine – drums
Bob Felts – percussion

Production
Producer – Al De Lory
Arranged by Al De Lory, Marty Paich
Conductor – Al De Lory
Engineers – Joe Polito, Pete Abbot

Charts
Album – Billboard (United States)

Singles – Billboard (United States)

References

Glen Campbell albums
1970 albums
Capitol Records albums
Albums arranged by Marty Paich
Albums recorded at Capitol Studios